Sheraton Kalouria is an American television executive based in Los Angeles, California, and the former president and chief marketing officer at Sony Pictures Television.

Early life
Kalouria is a graduate of Ohio's Miami University which he attended between 1983 and 1987.  He received his MBA from the Kellogg School of Management at Northwestern University in 1993.

Career
Before moving into broadcast, Kalouria was an account supervisor at Grey Advertising, overseeing media for Kraft Foods. Kalouria was also a marketing manager at CompuServe.

From August 1996 through May 2000, Kalouria held several positions at Walt Disney Corporation's ABC. He was initially named director, marketing, kids and family programming, where he managed the network's marketing and on-air promotions for family,  children's, and daytime programming. In 1998 Kalouria was named vice president of marketing & promotion, ABC daytime, overseeing the network's soaps and daytime talk. Kalouria led ABC's daytime marketing team and was responsible for the development of all on- and off-air promotions, paid advertising as well as marketing for the network's daytime talk show, The View. Kalouria also spearheaded the redesign of ABC.com's daytime sections.

From May 2000 through November 2005, Kalouria served as senior vice president of daytime programming for NBCU, providing strategic planning and creative vision for NBC's daytime programming, which included soaps Days of Our Lives and Passions. Kalouria also provided consulting services to NBCU's Telemundo and PAX. During Kalouria's tenure, NBC went from third to first place in the 18-to-49 female demographic and remained on top for four years.

From 2005 through 2008 Kalouria served as president of television for Martha Stewart Living Omnimedia (MSLO) in New York City, he was responsible for development and production of global programming for cable, broadcast, syndication and DVD as well as managing MSLO's development in the area of digital content for video on demand, web and mobile platforms. On signing with MSLO Kalouria was granted shares of restricted stock and options.

On September 29, 2010, Sony Pictures Television named Sheraton Kalouria senior vice president of programming business development. Subsequently, Kalouria was named executive vice president and chief marketing officer, overseeing the division's marketing globally for over 30 high-profile shows, including Breaking Bad, Better Call Saul, The Blacklist, The Goldbergs, Helix, Community, Outlander, Masters of Sex, Justified and Shark Tank.

On April 27, 2016, Steve Mosko, chairman of Sony Pictures Television, named Kalouria as president and chief marketing officer for Sony Pictures Television,. Kalouria is now responsible for all SPT consumer licensing of series and brands.

References

Miami University alumni
Kellogg School of Management alumni
Businesspeople from Cleveland
Living people
Sony Pictures Television employees
21st-century American businesspeople
1965 births